Sofia Raffaeli (born 19 January 2004) is an Italian individual rhythmic gymnast. She is the 2022 World all-around, hoop, ball, ribbon and team champion, as well as the 2022 European hoop and clubs champion. She is also the 2019 Junior World silver medalist with rope and clubs. She is the first Italian individual rhythmic gymnast to medal and win a gold medal at the World Championships, European Championships, and World Games, and to win three all-around gold medals in the FIG World Cup circuit. 

At the national level, she is the 2022 Italian National all-around champion, 2021 Italian National all-around silver medalist, and 2020 Italian National all-around bronze medalist. As of 2022, she is the most decorated individual rhythmic gymnast from the Italian Gymnastics Federation.

Personal life
Raffaeli was born in Chiaravalle, Marche; Italy. Her mother Milena Martarelli is an engineer at the University of Ancona, while her father Ganni Raffaeli is an architect. She has a younger brother, Pietro Raffaeli who does fencing. Raffaeli got involved in artistic gymnastics at the age of three, and switched to rhythmic gymnastics four years later.

In 2021, she joined the Sports Group of the Fiamme Oro.

Career

Junior
She represented Italy at the 2018 Junior European Championships in Guadalajara, Spain, where she qualified to the clubs final and she finished in 5th place. In 2019, she competed at the 2019 Junior World Championships in Moscow, Russia. She won three silver medals - Team, Rope and Clubs, she also placed 8th in Ball and 7th in Ribbon.

Senior
She won a bronze medal in All-Around finals at the 2020 Italian National Championships behind Milena Baldassarri and Alexandra Agiurgiuculese. And she also won a gold medal in clubs and a silver medal in ball.

2021
In the 2021 Season, Raffaeli made her senior international debut at the 2021 Sofia World Cup. She finished 10th All-Around behind Sabina Tashkenbaeva and qualified to two apparatus finals, where she won a silver medal with clubs and a bronze medal with ribbon. On April 16–18, Raffaeli competed at the 2021 Tashkent World Cup where she finished 4th All-around behind Anastasiia Salos, and qualified to three apparatus finals, winning a silver medal with hoop and ribbon, and also placing 4th in clubs. In May, Raffaeli participated at the 2021 Pesaro World Cup where she placed 8th in the All-round behind Laura Zeng and qualified to 2 apparatus finals placing 6th in clubs and 5th in ribbon. In June, she won the silver medal in the All-around final at the 2021 Italian National Championships only behind Milena Baldassarri and in front of Alexandra Agiurgiuculese. She also managed to enter all four apparatus finals winning 1st in clubs, 2nd in hoop and 3rd in ball and ribbon. Raffaeli was then selected to compete at the 2021 Rhythmic Gymnastics European Championships, in Varna, Bulgaria, along with Alexandra Agiurgiuculese. She qualified to  the individual all-round final and the clubs final, where she finished both finals in 8th place. At the 2021 Marbella Grand Prix Final, Raffaeli placed 4th All-around behind Anastasia Simakova and she also placed 1st in clubs, 3rd in ball and ribbon, and 7th in hoop. She was selected to represent Italy at the 2021 World Championships in Kitakyushu, Japan, at her senior world championships debut, she won a bronze medal in the hoop final. Raffaeli also made it into the individual all-around final, finishing in 6th place behind Viktoriia Onoproenko. She also won a silver medal in the team competition, together with Milena Baldassarri, Alexandra Agiurgiuculese, and the Italian group.

2022
In the 2022 season, Raffaeli competed at the 2022 World Cup Athens and won the gold medal in All-around, in front of Daria Atamanov, becoming the first (and only, to date) Italian individualist to win a gold medal in the All Around event of a FIG World Cup stage and qualified to three apparatus finals, winning two gold medals with ball and clubs, and a silver medal with hoop. On April 8–10, Raffaeli competed at the 2022 World Cup Sofia where she finished 2nd All-around behind Boryana Kaleyn. She also won 3 silver medals with hoop, ball, clubs and she placed 6th in ribbon. On April 22–24, Raffaeli competed at the 2022 World Cup Baku where she won her second all-around title in her career ahead of Boryana Kaleyn and teammate Milena Baldassarri. She also won a gold medal with hoop, two bronze medals with ball and clubs and she placed 5th in ribbon. On May 27–29, Raffaeli competed at the 2022 Italian National Championships where she won the gold medal in the general all-around competition and she also managed to win four gold medals in the speciality finals all in front of Milena Baldassarri. On June 3–5, Raffaeli competed at the 2022 World Cup Pesaro where she won the gold medal in the all around competition. On top of that she won 3 gold medals in the hoop, ball and clubs final and a sliver medal with the ribbon behind Viktoriia Onopriienko. Therefore she wins the trophy of the entire world cup circuit and she also wins 3 more trophies with hoop, ball and clubs. From June 15–19, Raffaeli competed at the 2022 European Championships in Tel Aviv, Israel where she won 2 gold medals and 2 sliver medals in the hoop, clubs, ball and team final respectively, making her the first Italian rhythmic gymnast to win a medal and the first Italian rhythmic gymnast to win a gold medal at the European Championships.  She even broke the record for the highest score ever for an individualist, achieving a score of 36.150 with hoop during qualifications. On July 12–13, Raffaeli competed at the World Games 2022 where she won the gold medal in the clubs final and two silver medals in the hoop and ball final, becoming the first Italian rhythmic gymnast to win a medal and the first Italian rhythmic gymnast to win a gold medal at the World Games.
On August 26-28, Raffaeli competed at the 2022 World Challenge Cup Cluj-Napoca where she won the gold medal in the all around competition, becoming the first Italian rhythmic gymnast to win an all-around gold medal at a World Challenge Cup. During qualifications, she once again broke the record for the highest score for an individualist, achieving a score of 36.200 with hoop. On top of that she won 2 gold medals in the hoop and ribbon final and a bronze medal with clubs. From September 14-18, Raffaeli represented Italy at the World Championships in Sofia, Bulgaria, where she won 5 gold medals in the all-around, hoop, ball, ribbon and team competition and a bronze medal in the clubs final. Therefore she became the first and only Italian individual rhythmic gymnast to win a specialty gold medal, all-around medal and all-around gold medal at a World Championships.

2023
In the 2023 season, Raffaeli competed at the Grand Prix RG Marbella 2023 where she won a gold medal in the all around and ribbon competition, and a silver medal in the clubs final.
Raffaeli, on March 18, competed at the 2023 World Cup Athens and won the gold medal in the All-around competition. She also won a gold medal in the hoop final and a silver medal in the ball final.

Achievements 
 First, and only, Italian individual rhythmic gymnast to win an all-around gold medal at the FIG World Cup series.
 First, and only, Italian individual rhythmic gymnast to win a medal with the hoop at the World Championships.
 First, and only, Italian individual rhythmic gymnast to win a medal at the Junior World Championships.
 First, and only, Italian individual rhythmic gymnast to win the World Cup Circuit.
 First, and only, Italian individual rhythmic gymnast to win a  medal at the European Championships.
 First, and only, Italian individual rhythmic gymnast to win a gold medal at the European Championships.
 First, and only, Italian individual rhythmic gymnast to win a medal at the World Games.
 First, and only, Italian individual rhythmic gymnast to win a gold medal at the World Games.
 First, and only, Italian individual rhythmic gymnast to win an all-around gold medal at a World Challenge Cup.
 First, and only, Italian individual rhythmic gymnast to win a gold medal at a World Championships.
 First, and only, Italian individual rhythmic gymnast to win an all-around gold medal at a World Championships.
 First, and only, Italian individual rhythmic gymnast to win an all-around medal at a World Championships.

Routine music information

Competitive highlights
(Team competitions in seniors are held only at the World Championships, Europeans and other Continental Games.)

References

External links
 
 

Living people
2004 births
Italian rhythmic gymnasts
Medalists at the Junior World Rhythmic Gymnastics Championships
Medalists at the Rhythmic Gymnastics World Championships
Medalists at the Rhythmic Gymnastics European Championships
Competitors at the 2022 World Games
World Games gold medalists
World Games silver medalists
21st-century Italian women